Yuriy Gorodnichenko is an economist and Quantedge Presidential professor at the University of California, Berkeley.

Gorodnichenko is also a visiting scholar at the Federal Reserve Bank of San Francisco, a faculty research associate at the National Bureau of Economic Research, a research fellow at the Institute for the Study of Labor. Gorodnichenko was the chair of the International Academic Board of the Kyiv School of Economics.  

Gorodichenko is a coeditor of the Journal of Monetary Economics. Previously, he was a coeditor of the Review of Economics and Statistics. Gorodnichenko also serves on the editorial board of Visnyk of the National Bank of Ukraine. Gorodnichenko is a cofounder of VoxUkraine. Gorodnichenko is a member of the executive committee of the Association for Comparative Economic Studies (ACES).  

A significant part of his research has been about monetary policy (effects, optimal design, inflation targeting), fiscal policy (countercyclical policy, government spending multipliers), taxation (tax evasion, inequality), economic growth (long-run determinants, globalization, innovation, financial frictions), and business cycles. His work was published in leading economics journals such as American Economic Review, Journal of Political Economy, Quarterly Journal of Economics, Review of Economic Studies, Journal of European Economic Association, and many others.  

Gorodnichenko received awards for his teaching and research, including Sloan Research Fellowship, NSF CAREER award, World Junior Prize in Monetary Economics and Finance, Excellence Award in Global Economic Affairs, fellow of the Econometric Society, and others. Gorodnichenko's research was funded by the National Science Foundation, Alfred P. Sloan Foundation, National Bureau of Economic Research, Social Security Administration, Google, and other agencies and firms.    

RePEc ranks Gorodnichenko as the top young economist in the world.

References

21st-century Ukrainian economists
1978 births
Ukrainian academics
Living people
University of California, Berkeley College of Letters and Science faculty
University of Michigan alumni
Fellows of the Econometric Society